"Mr. Bartender (It's So Easy)" is a song by American rock band Sugar Ray. It was released in April 2003 as the lead single from their album, In the Pursuit of Leisure. The song reached number 20 on the Billboard Adult Top 40 Tracks and featured hip hop artist ProHoeZak.

It heavily samples the R&B group Midnight Star's 1983 single "No Parking (On the Dance Floor)," in addition to incorporating the main guitar riff from Sweet's 1978 hit, "Love is Like Oxygen".

Music video
The music video premiered in May 2003 and features the band working at a car wash.

Charts

References

2003 singles
2003 songs
Song recordings produced by David Kahne
Sugar Ray songs